Forest City is a village in Mason County, Illinois, United States. The population was 222 at the 2020 census.

Geography
Forest City is located in northern Mason County at  (40.370103, -89.829504).

Sand Ridge State Forest occupies hilly country to the northwest.

Demographics

As of the census of 2000, there were 287 people, 101 households, and 81 families residing in the village. The racial makeup of the village was 98.61% White, 1.05% Native American, and 0.35% from two or more races.

There were 101 households, out of which 32.7% had children under the age of 18 living with them, 73.3% were married couples living together, 5.0% had a female householder with no husband present, and 19.8% were non-families. 13.9% of all households were made up of individuals, and 5.9% had someone living alone who was 65 years of age or older. The average household size was 2.84 and the average family size was 3.14.

In the village, the population was spread out, with 27.2% under the age of 18, 11.8% from 18 to 24, 26.8% from 25 to 44, 21.6% from 45 to 64, and 12.5% who were 65 years of age or older. The median age was 36 years. For every 100 females, there were 114.2 males. For every 100 females age 18 and over, there were 111.1 males.

The median income for a household in the village was $36,250, and the median income for a family was $35,625. Males had a median income of $27,000 versus $15,000 for females. The per capita income for the village was $13,855. About 4.3% of families and 8.0% of the population were below the poverty line, including 8.6% of those under the age of eighteen and none of those 65 or over.

References

Villages in Mason County, Illinois
Villages in Illinois